Kharkiv Raion is a raion (district) of Kharkiv Oblast in eastern Ukraine. Its administrative center is the city of Kharkiv. Population: 

On 18 July 2020, as part of the administrative reform of Ukraine, the number of raions of Kharkiv Oblast was reduced to seven, and the area of Kharkiv Raion was significantly expanded. One abolished raion, Derhachi, as well as Liubotyn Municipality, part of Nova Vodolaha Raion, and the city of Kharkiv, which was previously incorporated as a city of oblast significance and did not belong to the raion, were merged into Kharkiv Raion. The January 2020 estimate of the population of the former Kharkiv Raion was

Subdivisions

Current
After the reform in July 2020, the raion consisted of 15 hromadas:
 Bezliudivka settlement hromada with the administration in the urban-type settlement of Bezliudivka, retained from Kharkiv Raion;
 Derhachi urban hromada with the administration in the city of Derhachi, transferred from Derhachi Raion;
 Kharkiv urban hromada with the administration in the city of Kharkiv, transferred from the city of oblast significance of Kharkiv;
 Liubotyn urban hromada with the administration in the city of Liubotyn, transferred from Liubotyn Municipality;
 Lyptsi rural hromada with the administration in the village of Lyptsi, retained from Kharkiv Raion;
 Mala Danylivka settlement hromada with the administration in the urban-type settlement of Mala Danylivka, transferred from Derhachi Raion;
 Merefa urban hromada with the administration in the city of Merefa, retained from Kharkiv Raion;
 Nova Vodolaha settlement hromada with the administration in the urban-type settlement of Nova Vodolaha, transferred from Nova Vodolaha Raion;
 Pisochyn settlement hromada with the administration in the urban-type settlement of Pisochyn, retained from Kharkiv Raion;
 Pivdenne urban hromada with the administration in the city of Pivdenne, retained from Kharkiv Raion;
 Rohan settlement hromada with the administration in the urban-type settlement of Rohan, retained from Kharkiv Raion;
 Solonytsivka settlement hromada with the administration in the urban-type settlement of Solonytsivka, transferred from Derhachi Raion;
 Tsyrkuny rural hromada with the administration in the village of Tsyrkuny, retained from Kharkiv Raion;
 Vilkhivka rural hromada with the administration in the village of Vilkhivka, retained from Kharkiv Raion;
 Vysokyi settlement hromada with the administration in the urban-type settlement of Vysokyi, retained from Kharkiv Raion.

Before 2020

Before the 2020 reform, the raion consisted of nine hromadas:
 Bezliudivka settlement hromada with the administration in Bezliudivka;
 Lyptsi rural hromada with the administration in Lyptsi;
 Merefa urban hromada with the administration in Merefa;
 Pisochyn settlement hromada with the administration in Pisochyn;
 Pivdenne urban hromada with the administration in Pivdenne;
 Rohan settlement hromada with the administration in Rohan;
 Tsyrkuny rural hromada with the administration in Tsyrkuny;
 Vilkhivka rural hromada with the administration in Vilkhivka;
 Vysokyi settlement hromada with the administration in Vysokyi.

References

 
Raions of Kharkiv Oblast
1923 establishments in Ukraine